Eric Petro Deakins (born 7 October 1932) is a British Labour Party politician. He was the Member of Parliament for Walthamstow West from 1970 to February 1974, and Walthamstow from that election until 1987. He has also worked as an international public affairs consultant.

Early life
Deakins was born as the elder son of the late Edward Deakins and Gladys Deakins. He was educated at Tottenham Grammar School and the London School of Economics, and became a commercial executive. He served as a councillor on Tottenham Borough Council between 1958 and 1961, and from 1962 to 1963.

Political career
Deakins was unsuccessful in his first three attempts to be elected a Member of Parliament (MP), including in Finchley in 1959 against future Prime Minister Margaret Thatcher (who entered the House of Commons on her own third attempt), and Chigwell in 1966. However, he was later elected MP for Walthamstow West in 1970, reversing his by-election loss to the Conservatives of that seat in 1967.

He gave his maiden speech on 16 July 1970. Speaking in favour of the second reading of the Misuse of Drugs Bill, he raised a series of reservations: "It attacks socially unacceptable drugs but does nothing about socially acceptable drugs."

After boundary changes in 1974, Walthamstow West was merged into the new constituency of Walthamstow, which he continued to represent.

During the Labour government of 1974–1979, under Harold Wilson and James Callaghan, Deakins was a junior minister for Trade (1974–1976) and the Department of Health and Social Security (1976–1979). He represented Walthamstow until he was defeated at the 1987 general election, gaining 34% of the vote compared to the 39% polled by his Conservative opponent Hugo Summerson. His defeat was against the national trend, but seemed to some political observers to follow a rates increase by the Labour-controlled Waltham Forest London Borough Council. , this is the last time that the Labour Party has not won Walthamstow.

Personal life 
Outside politics, his interests are writing, cinema, yoga and football. In 1990, he married Sandra Weaver; they have a son and two daughters. He lives in Camden Town, north west London.

Publications 

 A Faith to Fight For, 1964
 You And Your Member Of Parliament (with Nance Fyson), 1987
 What Future for Labour?, 1988

References
Times Guide to the House of Commons, 1966 & 1987

Notes

External links 
 

1932 births
Living people
Labour Party (UK) MPs for English constituencies
Councillors in Greater London
UK MPs 1970–1974
UK MPs 1974
UK MPs 1974–1979
UK MPs 1979–1983
UK MPs 1983–1987
People from Tottenham
Labour Party (UK) councillors
Alumni of the London School of Economics